The legislative districts of Biliran are the representations of the province of Biliran in the Congress of the Philippines. The province is currently represented in the lower house of the Congress through its lone congressional district.

It was represented as part of the third district of Leyte in 1995.

Lone District 
Population (2020): 179,312

See also 
Legislative districts of Leyte

References 

Biliran
Politics of Biliran